Sunstate Airlines is a subsidiary of Qantas which operates regional flights under the QantasLink banner throughout Queensland, and between Brisbane and Canberra. Its head office is in Bowen Hills, Brisbane.

History
The company's roots extend back to 1975, when Noosa Air began operating in December of that year between Noosa and Brisbane using a Britten-Norman Islander. Maryborough businessman Bevan Whitaker, owner of the parent company of Noosa Air, Whitaker Pty Ltd, set up a second airline that commenced operations in December 1981, serving intrastate routes in Queensland vacated by Trans Australia Airlines (TAA) with Embraer EMB 110 Bandeirante aircraft. This second airline was called Sunstate Airlines.

Initially the two airlines used separate airline codes. In 1983, Sunstate changed its code to that of Noosa Air, and by the end of the year, the two airlines had merged fully. From 1 January 1984, all flights were conducted under the Sunstate name as part of TAA's Queensland network. The diverse, combined fleet consisted of two Islanders, two Bandeirantes, three de Havilland Canada DHC-6 Twin Otters and a Short 330. Within a few months, the Islanders and the Short 330 were replaced by a GAF N.24A Nomad and a Short 360, with the Islanders going to associated company Whitaker Air Services.

In 1986 Sunstate purchased a share in Victorian airline, Mildura-based Murray Valley Airlines (MVA), which was established in 1975 but ceased operations in October 1986 due to financial problems. Operations recommenced on 9 November 1986 as Sunstate Airlines (Mildura) on the old MVA routes from Mildura to Melbourne, to Adelaide via Renmark, South Australia, and to Broken Hill, New South Wales. The airline now had two unconnected networks. The following year Sunstate expanded in its original territory when financially troubled Air Queensland gave up its routes in South-East Queensland; Sunstate took over these routes on 1 June. The airline had prepared for the route handover by acquiring more aircraft, its fleet by then consisted of four Nomads (two N24As and two N.22s), three Bandeirantes, three Twin Otters, two Short 360s and a Short 330 in Queensland; and a Short 360 and Cessna 404 in Victoria.

In 1989 Australian Airlines, the successor to TAA and previously the owner of now-defunct Air Queensland, took a one-third share in Sunstate. Shortly afterwards Sunstate commenced operations out of Cairns and the fleet was somewhat rationalised, now consisting of 3 Short 360s, 2 Short 330s, 2 Twin Otters, and a Bandeirante transferred from the Mildura operation. Meanwhile, Sunstate Airlines (Mildura) was awarded a five-year contract to operate air ambulance flights on behalf of the Ambulance services of Victoria. To serve the contract it took a Cessna 404 the Queensland operation had acquired from the break-up of Air Queensland, its own Cessna 404, and four others. To maintain its airline operations a succession of Cessna 404s were leased one at a time from Eastern Australia Airlines, Australian Airlines' regional subsidiary in New South Wales.

1990s
In October 1990 Australian Airlines become the outright owner of Sunstate Airlines and Sunstate Airlines (Mildura). The Mildura operation was subsequently rebranded as Southern Australia Airlines, commencing operations under that name on 1 January 1992. The following month it took delivery of its first pressurised aircraft, a de Havilland Canada DHC-8-100 Dash 8. A second Dash 8 was delivered in March 1992 and the Short 360 was transferred to Sunstate Airlines in July. Southern Australia used the Dash 8s to expand its services, taking over Eastern Australia Airlines routes across Bass Strait from Melbourne to Launceston and Devonport in Tasmania.

Sunstate took delivery of 3 additional Dash 8s, placing them in service in mid-1992, and took over more routes from Australian Regional Airlines of Queensland, another Australian Airlines subsidiary operating in Queensland that rose after the demise of Air Queensland. It also commenced operations from Brisbane into New South Wales, flying once a week to Lord Howe Island from 20 September 1992. Both Southern Australia and Sunstate also started using Australian Airlines' 'TN' airline code for all of their services following the purchase.

On 1 October 1993, Sunstate absorbed Australian Regional Airlines, taking over its fleet and routes. Before and after the takeover Sunstate rationalised its fleet, now having the three Dash 8s, four Short 360s and five Twin Otters. At the end of that month both Southern Australia and Sunstate changed airline codes again, now operating with the 'QF' of Qantas after that airline shut down Australian Airlines on 30 October. Qantas now found itself with some of the smallest aircraft in the Australian airline industry (Southern Australia's 2 Cessna 404s) and the biggest in the industry (its Boeing 747s and 767s and the former Australian Airlines Airbus A300s). Following Australian Airlines' ceasing operations, Southern Australia commenced flying between Melbourne and Canberra.

In the mid-1990s, both Southern Australia and Sunstate expanded steadily. In 1994 Southern Australia's air ambulance contract was renewed for another five years. Its fleet was expanded in December 1996 when it took delivery of two British Aerospace BAe 146s, using them to commence operations on trunk routes from Hobart and Launceston to Sydney, Melbourne and Adelaide. In 1998 Southern Australia withdrew from the Mildura - Broken Hill route in July, and from Mildura to Adelaide via Renmark in October, and the two airline Cessna 404s were taken out of service. The air ambulance contract and aircraft were taken over by the Royal Flying Doctor Service of Australia from 1 November that year.

By the end of 1997, Sunstate added another Dash 8 and more Short 360s, so that it was operating four of the former and eight of the latter, along with the five Twin Otters, to a network of 21 destinations in Queensland and New South Wales (including to Newcastle, New South Wales from May). The following year the Twin Otters and three Short 360s were withdrawn after Qantas sold the portfolio of islands in the Great Barrier Reef it had inherited from Australian Airlines (Brampton Island, Dunk Island, Great Keppel Island and Lizard Island); and a DHC-8-200 was added.

2000–present
In 2001, both Sunstate and Southern Australia (as well as Eastern Australia Airlines, Impulse Airlines and National Jet Systems' Airlink operation) were rebranded as QantasLink, though each entity retained a certain amount of independence. The Southern Australia name subsequently disappeared when it was absorbed into Eastern Australia Airlines.

Also in 2001 Sunstate began re-equipping with the Q300 version of the Dash 8. It eventually received six Q300s and disposed of its remaining Short 360s, thereby achieving an all-Dash 8 fleet.

In 2006 Sunstate took delivery of seven Bombardier Dash 8 Q400. Five were placed in service on its Queensland routes, while two were used to commence new services between Sydney and Canberra. The Q400 fleet has since expanded and smaller variants of the Dash 8 have been progressively withdrawn from service to accommodate the increased capacity of the Q400.

Destinations

From Brisbane

Albury (seasonal)
Barcaldine
Blackall
Bundaberg
Cairns
Canberra
Charleville
Cooma (seasonal)
Emerald
Gladstone
Hamilton Island
Hervey Bay
Longreach
Mackay
Moranbah
Newcastle
Rockhampton
Roma
Townsville

From Cairns

Hamilton Island
Horn Island
Mackay
Moranbah
Port Moresby
Rockhampton
Townsville
Weipa

From Townsville

Cloncurry
Mount Isa
Mackay
Rockhampton
Brisbane

From Melbourne

Devonport
Launceston
Mildura

From Sydney

Cooma (seasonal)
Canberra
Toowoomba

Fleet

As of August 2019 the Sunstate Airlines fleet consists of:

See also
List of airlines of Australia

References

External links

Sunstate Airlines Fleet - Planespotters.net

Airlines established in 1981
Australian companies established in 1981
Companies based in Brisbane
Former Oneworld affiliate members
Qantas
Airlines of Australia
Regional airlines